Within the context of building construction and building codes, "occupancy" refers to the use, or intended use, of a building, or portion of a building, for the shelter or support of persons, animals or property.  A closely related meaning is the number of units in such a building that are rented, leased, or otherwise in use. Lack of occupancy, in this sense, is known as "vacancy".

Building codes
It is possible to have multiple occupancies (or building uses) within one building. For example, a high-rise building can have retail stores occupying the lower levels, while the upper levels are residential. Different occupancies within a building are separated by a fire barrier with a defined fire-resistance rating. It is common for a penetration (such as a fire door) to have a fire protection rating lower than the wall fire–resistance rating in which it is installed. For example, a two-hour fire separation normally requires fire doors rated at 90 minutes.

For some high challenge occupancies, the code requirements for an occupancy separation are more stringent than for other fire barriers, even with an identical fire resistance rating. In this case, an occupancy separation with a two-hour fire-resistance rating may not be able to "de-rate" its closures, such fire doors and firestops. For example, a two-hour rated "high challenge fire wall" requires two-hour rated fire doors.

Firestops in occupancy separations are also more likely to require an equal fire protection rating (a fire resistance rating for closures). They also must provide a temperature rating ensuring that the components of the firestop systems, including the penetrants are not permitted to rise in temperature above 140°C (284°F) on average or 180°C (356°F) at any single point, to lower the likelihood of auto-ignition on the unexposed side. In this manner, occupancy separations are treated similarly to fire walls which are structurally stable in case of a fire, thus limiting the danger of fire-induced building collapse.

In this sense, there are two occupancies in many single-family homes: the garage and the living space of the home.  Because automobile gasoline is flammable, an occupancy separation is often required between the two should there be a vehicle fire.  Water heaters and central heating are often placed in this space as well for their use of natural gas, propane, or other fossil fuels in combustion.  This also helps to prevent carbon monoxide poisoning.

Building utilization

Occupancy can also refer to the number of units in use, such as hotel rooms, apartment flats, or offices. When a motel is at full occupancy, it is common practice to turn on a NO VACANCY neon sign. Completely vacant buildings can also attract crime. A 2017 study found that demolishing vacant buildings "reduce crime by about 8 percent on the block group in question and 5 percent on nearby block groups". 

Occupancy can also refer to the number of persons using an undivided space, such as a meeting room, ballroom, auditorium, or stadium.  As with building codes, fire protection authorities often set a limit on the number of people that can occupy a space at one time. These limits are established primarily to allow all occupants safe passage through exits, but can also be employed to preserve the integrity of a structure. 

An occupancy sensor is a device that can tell if someone is in a room, and is often used in home automation and security systems.  These are typically more advanced than motion sensors, which can only detect motion.

Other meanings
In transport engineering, occupancy can refer to:
The number of passengers occupying a vehicle
The percentage of time in which a detector is occupied by a vehicle
The average number of particles occupying a state

In football, occupancy can refer to:
A team that does not currently have a manager, a president, or a home stadium

See also
Building code
Construction
Fire protection
Fire-resistance rating
Fireproofing
Firestop
List of human habitation forms
Passive fire protection
Penetrant

References

Fire protection